The Argentine Embassy in France is the diplomatic representation of the Argentine Republic to the French Republic. It is located in Paris and its ambassador has been, since 2020, HE Mr. Leonardo Daniel Costantino.

Location 
The embassy is located at 6 rue Cimarosa in the 16th arrondissement of Paris.

The construction of the mansion is the work of the architect Jacques Hermant. The building is in the Belle Époque style. It was commissioned by entrepreneur, businessman and art lover Léon Orsodi in January 1895, who lived there until 1923. The January 14, 1926, the building is purchased in the name of the Argentine government on a message from Argentine President Marcelo Torcuato de Alvear by Frederico Alvarez de Toledo, Argentine Ambassador to Paris, but without the authorization of the executive power. The next government refuses the purchase authorization and the house becomes the residence of the ambassador in a personal capacity. The headquarters of the embassy was finally installed there on February 10, 1964 .

In 1900, the embassy sat at 9 rue Alfred de Vigny, in the 8th arrondissement of Paris.

Ambassadors of Argentina in France

References

See also 
 List of diplomatic missions in France
List of diplomatic missions of Argentina
 Argentina–France relations

Argentina
Argentina–France relations
Diplomatic missions of Argentina
Buildings and structures in the 16th arrondissement of Paris